Deane Alfie Michael Smalley (born 5 September 1988) is an English professional footballer who is currently signed to Wythenshawe Town. His career saw him play as a striker before converting to playing as a centre-back when at Wythenshaw.

Career
Born in Chadderton, Greater Manchester, Smalley began his career with Oldham Athletic and regularly featured in the reserve squad, before making two appearances with the first at the end of the 2006–07 season. His first team debut came on 24 February 2007 in a 1–0 loss to Blackpool.

Smalley's first goal for the club came on 14 August 2007 in a 4–1 win versus Mansfield Town in the League Cup. On 28 August 2007, Smalley made his first start in a 3–0 loss to Burnley in the League Cup. On 26 April 2008, Smalley scored his first league goal for Oldham Athletic in a 2–1 win versus Cheltenham Town.

He joined Rochdale on a month-long loan on 23 September 2010 before joining Chesterfield on loan on 1 November.

At the end of the 2010–11 season he was offered a new contract by Oldham, but instead he rejected it to sign for Oxford United on a two-year contract. As Smalley was under the age of 24, Oldham Athletic were entitled to compensation from Oxford and agreed an undisclosed figure with the club.

He signed on loan for Bradford City in January 2012. He made his debut against Burton Albion, coming on as a 72nd-minute substitute for Nahki Wells. He returned to Oxford at the end of the season after making 13 appearances for Bradford.

On 25 August 2012, he scored twice as Oxford beat Plymouth Argyle 2–1 at the Kassam Stadium. After a poor injury-hit season, Smalley signed a new one-year deal with Oxford on reduced terms. He repaid the faith shown in him by scoring two goals in a 4–1 away victory over Portsmouth on the opening day of the 2013–14 season.

He signed for Plymouth Argyle on 20 May 2014, scoring his first goal for the club in a 1-1 League 2 draw with Stevenage. In December 2014 he suffered cruciate ligament injuries and only returned to the match day squad in November 2015, 11 months later, in a league game against Leyton Orient.

On 21 January 2016 Smalley joined Newport County on loan until the end of the 2015–16 season. He made his Newport debut in the starting line up versus Dagenham & Redbridge on 23 January 2016.

In the summer of 2018 he signed for Chester after a successful trial with the club.

On 13 February 2019, Smalley signed with Hyde United where he linked up with his brother Dom Smalley. He played 8 games for the club, scoring two goals, before joining Abbey Hey on 3 August 2019. In December 2020, he switched to North West Counties Football League Premier Division rivals Wythenshawe Town.

Career statistics

Honours
Chesterfield
Football League Two: 2010–11

References

External links
Deane Smalley profile at Oldham Athletic A.F.C.

1988 births
Living people
People from Chadderton
English footballers
Footballers from Oldham
Association football forwards
Newport County A.F.C. players
Plymouth Argyle F.C. players
Oldham Athletic A.F.C. players
Rochdale A.F.C. players
Chesterfield F.C. players
Oxford United F.C. players
Bradford City A.F.C. players
Chester F.C. players
Hyde United F.C. players
Abbey Hey F.C. players
English Football League players
National League (English football) players
Northern Premier League players
North West Counties Football League players
Wythenshawe Town F.C. players